Financial News is a financial newspaper and news website published in London.  It is a weekly newspaper, published by eFinancial News Limited, covering the financial services sector through news, views and extensive people coverage. Financial News was founded in 1996.

Financial News is owned by Dow Jones & Company, who acquired eFinancial News in 2007. It is part of the Dow Jones Media Group division, which also includes Barron's, Factiva, MarketWatch and Mansion Global.

Financial News launched a revamped, mobile-first website and new weekly print edition in January 2017.

Titles
In addition to the publication of the Financial News, the company also operates FNLondon.com, an updated daily website version of Financial News, and The Private Equity News, which provides daily news and analysis for Europe's private equity industry. The Private Equity News website is the counterpart to the weekly Private Equity News hard copy and was launched in 2003.

Coverage

The newspaper and website's coverage is primarily Europe, UK-focused. It is stratified by the financial services industry, with major weekly news and views pieces on investment banking, asset management, private equity, fintech, trading and regulation as well as people coverage spanning key moves, recruitment and employment trends, regulation around salaries and bonuses, business education, diversity and more.

Circulation

The ABC Audited average circulation for the Financial News print edition for the six-month period ending June 2016 was 15,808. The readership profile is highly educated and affluent professionals, mainly in the London-based financial services industries. The average annual income of Financial News readers is over 200,000 pounds sterling.

Visits to the main website in June 2016 was 319,728. The page views for the same month were about 720,000.

The Financial News website is fully mobile-responsive, allowing subscribers to access FN content via any mobile device, including phones and tablets.

References

External links
 Official website

Financial services companies established in 1996
Weekly newspapers published in the United Kingdom
Business newspapers published in the United Kingdom
Dow Jones & Company
Private equity media and publications
Newspapers established in 1996
1996 establishments in England
Newspapers published in London